William Hughes Field (17 July 1861 – 13 December 1944) was a Member of Parliament in New Zealand; first for the Liberal Party, then Independent, and then for the Reform Party. He made a significant contribution to the development of tramping in the Tararua Range.

Private life

Field was born in Wanganui in 1861, the fourth son of Henry Claylands Field (1825–1912) and his wife Margaret Symes Purlow. Field was a lawyer practising in Wellington first elected to parliament in the by-election after the death of the sitting member, his elder brother, Henry Augustus Field (1852–1899). Tom Field (1914–1919), MHR (Member of the House of Representatives) for Nelson, was a relative.

Field was a significant figure in the tramping history of the Tararua Range of which he helped to promote the development of its most popular tramping route, known as the Southern Crossing. Within the Tararuas, both Field Peak and Field Hut, the oldest remaining purpose-built tramping hut in New Zealand, are named after him. He was a founding member of the Tararua Tramping Club, one of the first of many tramping clubs in New Zealand.

He was closely associated with improvement to the railway services to his electorate, one train was known as "Field's Express", and the construction of the Tawa Flat tunnel. He also led the campaign for the electrification of the Johnsonville service extended to Paekākāriki in 1940 and, 70 years later, to his electorate at Waikanae in February 2011. With Charles Gray of Pukerua Bay he was largely responsible for the Centennial Highway on the narrow coastline south of Paekākāriki.

Field married Isabel Hodgkins at St. Paul's Cathedral, Dunedin on 26 April 1893. Also known as Cissy she was a daughter of Dunedin watercolourist William Mathew Hodgkins and sister of the celebrated painter Frances Hodgkins. They were to have two daughters and three sons. Eldest daughter Lydia married Noel Pharazyn.

Member of Parliament
He then won it back in 1914, and held it until he retired in 1935.

He replaced his brother, Henry Augustus Field, when he died in 1899. William Field stood as a Liberal in 1900 and was regarded as a 'country liberal' or 'freehold liberal' and therefore it is not surprising that he moved politically to support the Reform Party over time.

In 1935, he was awarded the King George V Silver Jubilee Medal and in 1937, he was awarded the King George VI Coronation Medal.

Death
Field died in Wellington on 13 December 1944. He was survived by his wife and their five children.

Notes

References

1861 births
1944 deaths
Reform Party (New Zealand) MPs
Independent MPs of New Zealand
New Zealand Liberal Party MPs
19th-century New Zealand lawyers
People from Whanganui
Members of the New Zealand House of Representatives
New Zealand MPs for North Island electorates
Unsuccessful candidates in the 1911 New Zealand general election
19th-century New Zealand politicians
Pharazyn family